Paula Lima (born October 10, 1970 in São Paulo) is a Brazilian singer and composer whose music is influenced by bossa, percussion, samba, Brazilian soul international funk and one of judges of Brazilian Idol, Ídolos Brazil (Season 3 and Season 4).

Lima's career started a little by chance but she had been involved in different school festivals. In 1992, she joined her first band, the "Unidade Móvel", which later became "Unidade Bop". In 1995 she was invited to sing in a Samba, Rock, Funk and Soul band, led by Skowa.
Lima lists her influences to be Quincy Jones, Ella Fitzgerald, Elza Soares, Ed Motta, Gilberto Gil, Banda Black Rio and Jorge Benjor.

Paula also played Grizabella's role in the stage for both São Paulo's and Rio de Janeiro's productions of Cats in 2010.

Discography

Live albums

Featured songs

Videography

References

External links

Mondo Grosso – Life (Featuring [Vocals] Paula Lima) | https://www.discogs.com/Mondo-Grosso-MG4/release/124468

1970 births
Brazilian funk singers
Brazilian soul singers
Living people
Singers from São Paulo
21st-century Brazilian singers
21st-century Brazilian women singers
Women in Latin music